Giuseppe Minaudo (born March 22, 1967 in Mazara del Vallo) is an Italian former association football player.

Career
Minaudo started his career with F.C. Internazionale Milano, and gained national popularity after he came on the pitch from the bench to score the winning goal in the Derby della Madonnina against A.C. Milan on April 6, 1986; Minaudo was aged 19, and was still part of the Primavera under-19 time at the time, thus making him a character today still popular among Inter fans.

Before to leave Internazionale in 1988, he played a total forty games with the nerazzurri, scoring three times. Since then, he played mostly at Serie A and Serie B level with teams such as Udinese, Ancona, Atalanta and Torino (the latter being his last team in the Italian top flight). In 1996, he moved down to the third tier, with Fidelis Andria, and then spent four more seasons at Serie C1 and Serie C2 level. He retired in 2003 with amateur side Ghisalbese.

References

1967 births
Living people
People from Mazara del Vallo
Serie A players
Serie B players
Inter Milan players
Udinese Calcio players
A.C. Ancona players
Atalanta B.C. players
Piacenza Calcio 1919 players
Torino F.C. players
S.S. Fidelis Andria 1928 players
U.S. Cremonese players
Novara F.C. players
S.S. Juve Stabia players
Association football midfielders
Italian footballers
Footballers from Sicily
Sportspeople from the Province of Trapani